Dimethylacetamide (DMAc or DMA) is the organic compound with the formula CH3C(O)N(CH3)2. This colorless, water-miscible, high-boiling liquid is commonly used as a polar solvent in organic synthesis.  DMA is miscible with most other solvents, although it is poorly soluble in aliphatic hydrocarbons.

Synthesis and production
DMA is prepared commercially by the reaction of dimethylamine with acetic anhydride or acetic acid.  Dehydration of the salt of dimethylamine and acetic acid also furnishes this compound:
 CH3CO2H·HN(CH3)2 → H2O + CH3CON(CH3)2

Dimethylacetamide can also be produced by the reaction of dimethylamine with methyl acetate.

 
The separation and purification of the product is carried out by multistage distillation in rectification columns. DMA is obtained with essentially quantitive (99%) yield referred to methyl acetate.

Reactions and applications
The chemical reactions of dimethylacetamide are typical of N,N-disubstituted amides. Hydrolysis of the acyl-N bond occurs in the presence of acids:
 CH3CON(CH3)2 + H2O + HCl →  CH3COOH + (CH3)2NH2+Cl−
However, it is resistant to bases.  For this reason DMA is a useful solvent for reactions involving strong bases such as sodium hydroxide.

Dimethylacetamide is commonly used as a solvent for fibers (e.g., polyacrylonitrile, spandex) or in the adhesive industry. It is also employed in the production of pharmaceuticals and plasticizers as a reaction medium. 

A solution of lithium chloride in DMAc (LiCl/DMAc) can dissolve cellulose. Unlike many other cellulose solvents, LiCl/DMAc gives a molecular dispersion, i.e. a "true solution". For this reason, it is used in gel permeation chromatography to determine the molar mass distribution of cellulose samples.

Dimethylacetamide is also used as an excipient in drugs, e.g. in Vumon (teniposide), Busulfex (busulfan) or Amsidine (amsacrine).

Toxicity

Dimethylacetamide, like most simple alkyl amides, is of low acute toxicity. Chronic exposure can cause hepatotoxicity. At high doses (400 mg/kg body mass daily), dimethylacetamide causes effects on the central nervous system (e.g. depression, hallucinations and delusion).

Dimethylacetamide may be incompatible with polycarbonate or ABS. Devices (e.g. syringes) that contain polycarbonate or ABS can dissolve when coming into contact with dimethylacetamide.

Regulation

In 2011, dimethylacetamide was identified in the EU as a Substance of very high concern (SVHC) because of its reproductive toxicity. In 2014, the European Commission has started an investigation to restrict the use of dimethylacetamide in the EU according to REACH.

In 2015, the CNESST (Committee on Standards, Equity, Health and Safety at Work in Quebec) has adopted a tightened classification of dimethylacetamide:

References

External links
 Process flowsheet of Dimethylacetamide Production from Acetic Acid and Dimethylamine
 CDC – NIOSH Pocket Guide to Chemical Hazards

Amide solvents
Acetamides